The   are the first eight imperial anthologies of Japanese waka poetry, of which the first three collections are the Sandaishū. The Sandaishū provided both the language and organizational principles for the rest of the anthologies thereafter.  They are:
 Kokin Wakashū
 Gosen Wakashū
 Shūi Wakashū
 Goshūi Wakashū
 Kin'yō Wakashū
 Shika Wakashū
 Senzai Wakashū
 Shin Kokin Wakashū

References

Japanese poetry anthologies